The 1992 Little League World Series took place between August 24 and August 29 in South Williamsport, Pennsylvania. The team representing the Zamboanga City Little League, the Filipino representative in the Far East Region, won the International Championship while Long Beach, California, the United States West Region representative, won the U.S. Championship.

In the championship game, Zamboanga City defeated Long Beach 15–4 to become the first Asian team outside of Taiwan, South Korea, or Japan to be champion. However, upon further review it was discovered that the Filipino team violated age and residency rules and Little League stripped them of their title. Long Beach was awarded a 6–0 victory by forfeit as per Little League rules and became only the fourth American team in twenty years to be Little League World Champions.

The championship game did not feature a team from Taiwan for the first time since 1985. This tied the record of six consecutive finals set by Taiwan from 1977 through 1982. To date, this record has not been seriously approached by one country or state.

Far East series 
Between 1967, when Japan's West Tokyo won, and 1992, the Little League World Series was won 19 of a possible 25 times by the Far East champion. Competing against the national champions of traditionally stronger baseball nations like Japan, South Korea, and Taiwan, Filipino teams had been unable to qualify for the LLWS. In 1992, however, the Far East was represented by Zamboanga City, which had won the national Filipino title.

The tournament 
The 1992 tournament debuted the round-robin format; no longer would a team play against a predetermined opponent in the first round, with the winners facing each other in the semifinal, with the winner advancing to the Saturday championship.

The new format had each team play the other three teams in their bracket, and then having the top two teams play each other in the semifinal, with the winners advancing to the championship.

Zamboanga City defeated the teams from Germany and Quebec before losing to the Dominican Republic, in the round-robin. This was enough to get them into the international final, a rematch with the Dominican Republic, which they won 5–1.  The championship game against California was a blowout, with Zamboanga City winning 15–4 after a seven-run first inning.  The team was hailed as heroes in the Philippines, President Ramos giving the team a gift of 1,000,000 pesos to contribute to the livelihood of their families.  Long Beach head coach Jeff Burroughs remarked that semi-final pitcher "Roberto Placious" had the poise of a high school or college pitcher.

Teams

Pool play

Elimination round

Zamboanga City Little League

Initial investigation
There had been some suspicions about the Zamboanga City team soon after it arrived in Williamsport.  Several committee members did not think that the manager and coach seemed "typical."  However, nothing more came of it after assurances were given that the manager and coach were from the same league as the players and had coached in that league during the regular season.  A few days after Zamboanga City's triumphant victory, however, journalist Al Mendoza of the Philippine Daily Inquirer began publishing stories suggesting that some players were ineligible.  He had received letters from several neighbors and relatives claiming that several players were too old for Little League.  Local administrator Armando Andaya was faxed four questions from Little League president Creighton Hale, regarding player ages, birth certificates, residence, and a specific question regarding winning championship game pitcher Ian Tolentino's participation in a tournament in 1990 (possibly with the view of suggesting this would have made him over the age limit). Andaya admitted to violating rules on district representation—eight players were from outside the Zamboanga City area, some as far away as Luzon, and unable to speak Chabacano, the language most commonly spoken in Zamboanga. Andaya claimed that the eight players replaced, for various reasons, were unable to go to China for the Far East series and that the out-of-district substitutes were only used to make up numbers rather than to give the team an extra edge over their opponents.  He also admitted that the team's original coach had been replaced with someone from Manila.

Disqualification
Little League Baseball stripped Zamboanga City of its title.  Under Little League rules at the time, when a team was found to have used an ineligible player, it forfeited only its most recent game (otherwise they would have to put the entire tournament on hold while the teams that lost to the illegal team were put back into the tournament).  Since the revelation was made after the championship game, that game was declared a 6–0 forfeit victory for Long Beach, which was awarded the championship. The exposed players and parents remained defiant, and accused Little League Baseball of denying them due process.

More revelations
With many Filipinos outraged at what they saw as an unpatriotic betrayal by Mendoza, who was given the key to the city of Long Beach, fellow Inquirer journalist Armand N. Nocum conducted further investigation 
and found that even the six true Zamboangueños were over-age, including at least two as old as 15, and thus ineligible. It was discovered that, as with the eight non-district players, the fraud had been maintained by the players' assumption of identities of (eligible) players who had represented the city at the national championships, the families of whom were reportedly willing to reveal all, jealous of the prizes bestowed upon the players who had used their sons' identities to represent their country at the Far East and World Series. In some cases, even the parents of the ineligible players assumed appropriate identities to maintain the appearance of propriety. Nocum, a native of the area, had not wanted to believe such an egregious fraud was taking place, but discovered that even school officials were in on the cover-up.  Later, Nocum, seemingly backing Andaya's assertion that the substitutes were not chosen to artificially inflate the team's performance, told Sports Illustrated that had the original Zamboanga City team participated in the World Series, they would have trounced Long Beach by at least 30–4.

In an interesting postscript, Zamboanga City was disqualified from the Filipino national titles the very next year in another over-age player scandal.

Notable players
Sean Burroughs (Long Beach, California), MLB player from 2002 to 2012

Champions Path
The Long Beach LL had an undefeated record of 12 wins and 0 losses to reach the LLWS. In total their record was 17–0, the last win coming from the forfeit by the Philippines.

Notes

References

External links

Little League World Series
Little League World Series
Little League World Series
Little League World Series
Little League World Series
20th-century controversies in the United States
Baseball controversies